Argala may refer to:

 Greater adjutant, a member of the stork family, from its Bengali name hurghila
 José Miguel Beñaran Ordeñana, an assassinated Basque leader, from his Basque nickname Argala ("Slim")